Drunkard's Hole is a karst cave in Burrington Combe on the Mendip Hills in Somerset, England.

See also 
 Caves of the Mendip Hills

References 

Caves of the Mendip Hills
Limestone caves